The East Timor Medal is a New Zealand campaign medal, authorised in 2000, for award to New Zealanders who have served in East Timor from the commencement of the New Zealand involvement in June 1999 until 27 April 2006

This campaign medal is unique in that it has been awarded to civilians from more than a dozen New Zealand government, philanthropic, or commercial organisations. These organisations have included the New Zealand Red Cross, Oxfam, Department of Corrections, New Zealand Customs Service, Ministry of Agriculture and Forestry Quarantine Service, Ministry of Foreign Affairs and Trade, New Zealand Police, New Zealand Qualifications Authority, the International Olympic Committee, Airways Consulting Ltd, Vincent Aviation, and Radiola Corporation Ltd, as well as the New Zealand Defence Force. The award of the East Timor Medal to these New Zealand civilians recognises their valuable participation in New Zealand's efforts to protect and assist the East Timorese people, and in the reconstruction of East Timor.

Bibliography
 Mackay, J and Mussel, J (eds) - Medals Yearbook - 2005, (2004), Token Publishing.
 Crawford, J and Harper, G - Operation East Timor: The New Zealand Defence Force in East Timor, 1999-2001, (2001), Reed Publishing (NZ) Ltd

External links
 New Zealand Defence Force - Medal information page
 New Zealand Defence Force - Text of the Royal authorisation warrant 
 New Zealand Defence Force - Amendment to Royal authorisation warrant

New Zealand campaign medals
New Zealand
East Timor–New Zealand relations
Awards established in 2000
2000 establishments in New Zealand
Awards disestablished in 2006